The Sheic or She–Jiongnai languages are a branch of the Miao (Hmongic) language family. 

She (Ho-Ne) has long been recognized as a divergent language. It has been difficult to classify because of its numerous Chinese loanwords. Recently, it has been concluded that a few other Miao languages may be closer to She than to the rest of the family.

Languages
Taguchi (2012), in a computational phylogenetic study, found Ho Ne (She), Kiong Nai and Pana (Pa Na) to form a branch of the Miao (Hmongic) family, with She closest to Pa Na. Hsiu (2015, 2018), also in a computational phylogenetic study, found She to be closest to Kiong Nai, and added Younuo as a fourth language. 

She (Ho-Ne)
Kiong Nai (Jiongnai)
Pana
Younuo (Yuno)

Yuno has also been classified as Bahengic by Mao & Li (1997).

References

Hmongic languages
Languages of China